Saint-Maximin is a commune in the Gard department in southern France.

Population

Personalities
The poet and dramatist Jean Racine stayed in Saint-Maximin in 1661 and 1662. He went there with his maternal uncle, Antoine Sconin, vicar general of Uzès.

See also
Communes of the Gard department

References

Communes of Gard